Asian Paints Ltd is an Indian multinational paint company, headquartered in Mumbai, Maharashtra, India. The company is engaged in the business of manufacturing, selling and distribution of paints, coatings, products related to home décor, bath fittings and providing of related services. Asian Paints is India's largest and Asia's second largest paints corporation. Asian Paints is the holding company of Berger International. The company's manufacturing operations encompass 15 countries of the world including India, with considerable presence in the Indian subcontinent and the Middle East.

History 
The company was started in a garage in Gaiwadi, Girgaon, Mumbai by four friends Champaklal Choksey, Chimanlal Choksi, Suryakant Dani and Arvind Vakil. They all belong to Jain families, and founded the company in February 1942. During World War II and the Quit India Movement of 1942, a temporary ban on paint imports left only foreign companies and Shalimar Paints in the market. Asian Paints took up the market and reported an annual turnover of 23 crore in 1952 but with only 2% PBT margin. By 1967, it became the leading paints manufacturer in the country.

The four families together held the majority shares of the company. But disputes started over the global rights in 1990s when the company expanded beyond India. The disputes resulted in Choksey selling their 13.7% shares and exiting in 1997. Champaklal died in July 1997 and his son Atul took over. After failed collaboration talks with the British company Imperial Chemical Industries, Choksey's shares were mutually bought by the remaining three families and Unit Trust of India. , the Choksi, Dani and Vakil families hold a share of 47.81%.

Manufacturing locations 
The company along with its subsidiaries have 26 manufacturing facilities across 16 countries serving customer globally in over 65 countries.

Ownership structure 

The company has 12 institutional owners and shareholders that are investing through Securities Exchange Commission (SEC). Largest stakeholders include Bridge Builder International Equity Fund, and Touchstone Sands Capital Emerging Markets Growth Fund.

Marketing and advertising 
In 1950s, the company launched a "washable distemper", which was a balance between the cheap dry distemper that peeled easily and the more expensive plastic emulsions. Promoting their brand Tractor Distemper, the company used "Don't lose your temper, use Tractor Distemper" in their advertisings. In 1954, "Gattu" – a mischievous boy with a paint bucket in his hand – was launched as mascot. Created by R. K. Laxman, the mascot found appeal with the middle-classes.

He was used only in print advertisements and packaging till 1970s and by 1990s, was also seen on television advertisements. Gattu helped in bringing the commodity-led business of painters to the actual end users of home-owners. Ogilvy & Mather, the advertising agency associated with Asian Paints, launched marketing strategy by focusing on festive occasions in 1980s with their tag line "Har Ghar Kucch Kehta Hai" (Every home says something). Relating with festivals and important life events like marriages and child birth, the company advertised it as an occasion to paint homes by connecting on emotional level. In 1990s, the advertisements focused on the home exteriors, focusing on how the paints could keep the exteriors timeless. The company revamped its corporate identity in 2000s and axed Gattu as their mascot, and later changed its "Asian Paints" logo to the shorter "AP" mnemonic.

Shareholding pattern 
As of 31 March 2021

In 2022, Asian Paints Q1 net profit up 79% to ₹1,017 crore; revenue up 55%.

References

External links
 

Chemical companies of India
NIFTY 50
Indian brands
Paint companies of India
Indian companies established in 1942
BSE SENSEX
Asian Paints
Companies listed on the National Stock Exchange of India
Companies listed on the Bombay Stock Exchange